Rosenstand is a Danish surname. Notable people with the surname include: 

Peder Rosenstand-Goiske (1752–1803), Danish playwright and lawyer
Vilhelm Rosenstand (1838–1915), Danish painter and illustrator

Surnames of Danish origin